Wuak is a rural settlement in Pakan District, Sarawak, Malaysia.

History
An Iban warrior named Rentap built a fort at Wuak river before 1870.

Geography
Neighbouring settlements include:

References

Populated places in Sarawak